Melchor "Biboy" Ravanes (born January 6, 1959) is a former Filipino professional basketball player and former head coach of the San Miguel Beermen in the Philippine Basketball Association. Prior to this, he was SMB's longtime assistant coach.

Player profile

Ravanes was part of a wave of Cebuano cagers recruited by the squad, then known as San Miguel Braves in the MICAA. He was also a member of the franchise’s first championship in 1979. Apart from the Beermen, he also saw action for Shell and Alaska in his career that spanned 16 seasons. A tenacious defender, he was named to the league’s All-Defensive Team three times.

Coaching record

PBA

References

Filipino men's basketball coaches
1959 births
Filipino men's basketball players
Living people
Basketball players from Cebu
Sportspeople from Cebu City
San Miguel Beermen players
Shell Turbo Chargers players
Alaska Aces (PBA) players
Powerade Tigers coaches
Cebuano people
San Miguel Beermen coaches